Hurvitz may refer to:

People

Elazar Hurvitz, academic scholar in Talmudic studies
Eliyahu "Eli" Hurvitz (born 1932), Israeli industrialist
Rick Hurvitz, Executive Producer and Co-Creator of MTV's Pimp My Ride
Yair Hurvitz (1941–88), Israeli poet
Yigal Hurvitz (1918–94), Israeli politician

See also
Horovitz
Horowitz
Horvitz
Horwitz
Hurwitz

Jewish surnames